V. Dinesh Reddy is an Indian police officer from the state of Andhra Pradesh serving as the Director General of Andhra Pradesh Police. He is an Indian Police Service (IPS) officer from the 1977 batch of the Andhra Pradesh cadre. He completed his schooling from Hyderabad public school (HPS) and college from Madras Christian College (MCC) and St.Stephens Delhi. Dinesh Reddy joined the Indian Police Service on 30 July 1977 from the Andhra Pradesh Cadre and he retired serving as the Director General of Andhra Pradesh Police in 2013.

He held positions such as Hyderabad Range DIG, Warangal Range DIG, Excise and Prohibition Commissioner, IG Railways, Additional DG of Law and Order AP, Hyderabad city Police Commissioner, APSRTC MD, Director of Vigilance and Enforcement and Director General of Andhra Pradesh Police. He worked in both Telangana and Andhra regions. He is also keen in sports and supports it. He was elected and he served as The President of Hyderabad Hockey Association and then also as The President of All India Hockey Federation.

Political Campaign
Dinesh reddy, contested  on a YSR Congress Party’s ticket as a Lok Sabha candidate from Malkjgiri Constituency IN 2014. This constituency is one of the Lok Sabha (Lower House of the Parliament) constituencies in Telangana. This constituency came into existence in 2008, following the implementation of delimitation of parliamentary constituencies based on the recommendations of the Delimitation Commission of India constituted in 2002,Dinesh reddy joined bjp.

External links
 Official Website : www.dineshreddy.org
  Andhra Pradesh Police Website

References

Living people
Andhra Pradesh Police
Indian police officers
All India Services
Year of birth missing (living people)